Nabih Saleh is an island of Bahrain in the Arabian Gulf.

History
The island is named for the formerly separate islands of Nebbi and Saleh. Saleh was named for the Muslim scholar, Sheikh Saleh, who lived there in the 14th century.
This island originally, like Sitra, was covered with farms and date palm groves, but now it suffers from mass deforestation.
In 2016 renovation works began on the island

Demography
There are three neighborhoods located on the Island:
1. Kaflan
2. Quryah
3. Juzayyirah (occupied by Bahrain Defence Force as officers club)

Administration
The island belongs to the Capital Governorate.

Transportation
It is connected to both Bahrain Island and Sitra through the Sitra Causeway.

Image gallery

Notes

References

External links

 About Nabih Saleh 

Populated places in the Capital Governorate, Bahrain
Islands of Bahrain
Islands of the Persian Gulf